Orobanche clausonis is a species of plant in the family Orobanchaceae.

Sources

References 

clausonis
Flora of Malta